Yitzhak Sarfati also spelt Tsarfati (Hebrew: יצחק צרפתי) was a German-born, Ashkenazi rabbi who settled in the Ottoman Empire prior to the fall of Constantinople, and served as the Chief Rabbi of Edirne.

Biography 
Born in Germany sometime in the early 15th century, Sarfati was originally of French descent (his surname "Sarfati"  means "French" in Hebrew). That following year, he sent out a letter to the Jews of the Rhineland, Swabia, Styria, Moravia, and Hungary in which he spoke with great enthusiasm of the fortunate conditions of the Jews under Ottoman control, stating; "I proclaim to you that Turkey is a land wherein nothing is lacking, and where, if you will, all shall yet be well with you." The following years witnessed a massive emigration of Jews to the Turkish lands, considered the third main wave of Jewish immigrates to Turkey.

See also 
History of the Jews in Turkey

History of the Jews in the Ottoman Empire

Letter of Rabbi Yitzhak Sarfati

References 

15th-century German rabbis
Turkish rabbis
Turkish Ashkenazi Jews